Su Xinyue (born 8 November 1991) is a Chinese athlete specializing in the discus throw. She won the gold at the 2013 Asian Championships. She also competed at the 2013 World Championships failing to reach the final.

Her personal best throw is 65.59 metres (Neubrandenburg (GER) 2016).

International competitions

References

1991 births
Living people
Chinese female discus throwers
World Athletics Championships athletes for China
Athletes (track and field) at the 2016 Summer Olympics
Olympic athletes of China
Athletes (track and field) at the 2020 Summer Olympics
21st-century Chinese women